A Journal to Stella is a work by Jonathan Swift first partly published posthumously in 1766.

It consists of 65 letters to his friend, Esther Johnson, whom he called Stella and whom he may have secretly married. They were written between 1710 and 1713, from various locations in England, and though clearly intended for Stella's eyes were sometimes addressed to her companion Rebecca Dingley.

Amongst the references to contemporaries of Dean Swift, frequent mention is made of Elizabeth Germain. There is also mention of St. George Ashe, Bishop of Clogher, an old friend who by some accounts secretly married Swift to Stella in 1716.

Notes

External links
 Journal to Stella  – e-text at the University of Adelaide

Works by Jonathan Swift
British non-fiction books
1766 books
Books published posthumously